Gabrielle Rose (born 1954) is a Canadian film and stage actress.

Life and career
Rose was born in Kamloops, British Columbia. Her grandfather L. Arthur Rose was a playwright, producer, and performer. Her father Ian Rose was a child actor before he became a doctor.

Rose started her career in Britain, where she trained at the Bristol Old Vic Theatre School and later joined the Bristol Old Vic. Afterwards she worked in theatres in the UK for a decade, before returning to Canada.

She has an extensive résumé that includes multiple nominations for Genie Awards and Gemini Awards. She has worked with director Atom Egoyan on many films including Where the Truth Lies, The Sweet Hereafter, Speaking Parts, Family Viewing and The Adjuster, and with director Bruce Sweeney on the film Excited, for which she won the Leo Award for Best Supporting Performance by a Female in a Feature Length Drama.

Other appearances include the films In the Name of the King: A Dungeon Siege Tale, The Five Senses, On the Other Hand, Death and Sisters & Brothers, and recurring roles in such TV shows as Rising Damp, Dark Angel, Robson Arms, Fringe and Once Upon a Time. Her most recent role was co-starring with Hilary Swank in the Netflix Series Away. She has also done voice work.

In 2016 Rose was awarded the Ian Caddell Vancouver Film Critics Circle Award for Achievement for her significant contributions to B.C.’s film industry.

She is married to actor Hrothgar Mathews and has two sons.

Filmography

Film

Television

Awards/Nominations

References

External links

1954 births
Living people
20th-century Canadian actresses
21st-century Canadian actresses
Canadian film actresses
Canadian television actresses
Canadian voice actresses
Date of birth missing (living people)